Ron Rice (13 April 1923 – 11 February 2011) was an English footballer, who played as an inside forward in the Football League for Tranmere Rovers.

References

Tranmere Rovers F.C. players
Bradford City A.F.C. players
Association football inside forwards
English Football League players
Huddersfield Town A.F.C. players
1923 births
2011 deaths
People from Birkenhead
English footballers